Theresa Susey Helen Vane-Tempest-Stewart, Marchioness of Londonderry (née Chetwynd-Talbot; 6 June 1856 – 16 March 1919) was a British socialite and political hostess. She was a leading Unionist campaigner against Irish Home Rule, serving as president of the Ulster Women's Unionist Council from 1913 to 1919. She was said to be one of the most "dominating feminine personalities" of the time and was referred to as the "Queen of Toryism" and a "highwaywoman in a tiara."

Early life 

She was born was born Lady Theresa Chetwynd-Talbot in 6 June 1856 at Ingestre Hall, her family's estate in Staffordshire. She was the elder daughter of Charles Chetwynd-Talbot, 19th Earl of Shrewsbury and his wife Anna Theresa Cockerell (1836–1912). She was brought up with conservative values and was interested in politics. She was an admirer of Benjamin Disraeli.

Marriage 

She married Charles Vane-Tempest, Viscount Castlereagh, later the 6th Marquess of Londonderry, in the private chapel of Alton Hall in 1875. They were both leading Unionist campaigners against Irish independence. She was the President of the Ulster Women's Unionist Council. In 1893, she organised a petition of 20,000 women from Ulster to oppose the 1893 Home Rule bill in parliament.

She was considered the leading Tory hostess and entertained at the couples' houses at Wynyard Park, County Durham, Mount Stewart, County Down, Northern Ireland, and Londonderry House in London. Their guests included royalty. She was said to be one of the "dominating feminine personalities" of the time. She was referred to as the "Queen of Toryism" and a "highwaywoman in a tiara." She was said to be more persuasive than her husband, but they were united in their interests. She was not faithful to her husband.

In 1909 her portrait was made by John Singer Sargent. The painting is now held by the National Trust at Mount Stewart in County Down.

The couple had two sons and one daughter:
 Lady Helen Mary Theresa Vane-Tempest-Stewart (8 September 1876 – 14 January 1956); married Giles Fox-Strangways, 6th Earl of Ilchester, had issue
 Charles Stewart Henry Vane-Tempest-Stewart, 7th Marquess of Londonderry (13 May 1878 – 10 February 1949); married The Hon. Edith Chaplain, had issue
 Lord Charles Stewart Reginald Vane-Tempest-Stewart (4 December 1879 – 9 October 1899); died unmarried

Lady Londonderry was widowed in 1915 and died in 1919.

References 

1856 births
1919 deaths
British political hostesses
British socialites
Conservative Party (UK) people
Daughters of British earls
Home rule in Ireland
Irish marchionesses
Irish unionists
Theresa
Ulster unionism
Theresa